Simon Jonathan Turner (born 28 April 1960) played first-class and List A cricket for Somerset in 1984 and 1985. He was born at Cuckfield, West Sussex.

In first-class and List A cricket, Turner played as a left-handed lower-order batsman and wicketkeeper, acting as deputy to Trevor Gard in two spells – the month of July 1984 and a week in June 1985 – when Gard was injured. He made some useful runs in first-class matches with a highest score of 27 not out in the game against Glamorgan at Taunton in 1984. He was less successful with the bat in one-day matches.

Turner's younger brother, Rob, was Somerset's regular wicketkeeper for 15 years from 1991 to 2005. Simon Turner played high-calibre club cricket for Weston-super-Mare Cricket Club for more than 20 years from 1978, and his brother also played for the club. Turner has also played a handful of games for Axbridge cricket club in 2010 and 2011. The latest game for Axbridge was 11 September 2011 vs Horrington scoring 30 not out from 38 balls.

References

1960 births
Living people
English cricketers
Somerset cricketers
People from Cuckfield